Ciprian Tudosă (born 31 March 1997) is a Romanian rower. Comppeting in coxless pairs, together with Marius Cozmiuc, he won silver medals at the 2018 World Rowing Championships and 2021 Summer Olympics.

References

External links 
 World Rowing
 IOC

1997 births
Living people
Romanian male rowers
Rowers at the 2014 Summer Youth Olympics
Place of birth missing (living people)
Youth Olympic gold medalists for Romania
Rowers at the 2020 Summer Olympics
Medalists at the 2020 Summer Olympics
Olympic silver medalists for Romania
Olympic medalists in rowing